Cambodian nationality law determines who is a citizen of Cambodia under a 1996 nationality law. Cambodian citizenship is typically acquired through ancestry (being born to at least one Khmer parent) or naturalisation. Citizenship can also be purchased through business investments and donations. Dual nationality is permitted, although dual nationals may be viewed as Cambodian citizens in court proceedings.

Controversies

Dual citizenship 
In 2019, Reuters published an investigation that disclosed at least 8 relatives and high-ranking associates of Cambodian prime minister Hun Sen, including Lau Meng Khin, Choeung Sopheap, Neth Savoeun, and Aun Pornmoniroth, had acquired Cypriot citizenship through an investment scheme. In response, Cypriot opposition parties demanded an investigation. The programme was disbanded in 2020. In October 2021, the Parliament of Cambodia passed constitutional amendments that ban the prime minister and presidents of the National Assembly, Senate and Constitutional Council from being citizens of other countries. The law was enacted in November 2021.

Purchase of citizenship 
Cambodia's nationality laws enable foreigners to purchase Cambodian citizenship through business investments or donations to the Cambodian government's national budget. This pathway has enabled convicted criminals, including Chinese-born She Zhijiang, to acquire Cambodian citizenship.

References 

Nationality law
Law of Cambodia
History of nationality